Boys is a 1977 Danish drama film directed by Nils Malmros. The film was selected as the Danish entry for the Best Foreign Language Film at the 50th Academy Awards, but was not accepted as a nominee.

Cast
 Mads Ole Erhardsen as Ole som 5-årig
 Jesper Hede as Kresten
 Mette Marie Hede as Mette
 Lone Rode as Oles mor
 Poul Clemmensen as Oles far
 Lotte Hermann as Tanten
 Mikkel Hede as Barn
 Karen-Margrethe Nyborg as Barn
 Charlotte Winther Nielsen as Barn
 Gaute Munch as Barn
 Lars Junggren as Ole
 Inez Thomsen as Marianne
 Svend Schmidt-Nielsen as Mariannes far

See also
 List of submissions to the 50th Academy Awards for Best Foreign Language Film
 List of Danish submissions for the Academy Award for Best Foreign Language Film

References

External links
 

1977 films
1970s Danish-language films
1977 drama films
Films directed by Nils Malmros
Danish drama films
Best Danish Film Bodil Award winners